Keith Armstrong may refer to:

 Keith Armstrong (footballer) (born 1957), former footballer and football manager
 Keith Armstrong (author) (born 1946), North East England writer
 Keith Armstrong (American football) (born 1963), American football special teams coordinator